From Dusk to Dub is the fifth studio album by electro dubstep duo Blackburner and the follow-up to Drop Bass Not Bombs.

Track listing

Disc 1

Disc 2

Personnel 
Blackburner
Composers: R.E. Brown, A. Grant, Kevin Jeong, D.M. Carter Jr, Ben Mc, R.D. Montgomery, D. Reynolds, N. Ramsden J. Seopardie, D. Styles
Featured artists: Bob Marley, Lil Wayne, B.M.C., Jadakiss, Kurupt, Pusha T, Royce da 5'9", Sons of Hippies, Styles P, Yellowman

Production 
 Brain Perera – Executive producer

References

External links 
Blackburner - From Dusk To Dub (CD)

2014 albums
Blackburner albums